Malcolm Malpass (born 17 February 1947) is a British rower. He competed in the men's coxed eight event at the 1968 Summer Olympics.

References

1947 births
Living people
British male rowers
Olympic rowers of Great Britain
Rowers at the 1968 Summer Olympics
Sportspeople from Newcastle upon Tyne